The Short Hills Park historic district is the oldest area of that unincorporated community in Millburn, Essex County, New Jersey, United States. It consists of roughly a thousand acres (4 km²) with 125 buildings, mostly homes, in the area developed earliest by Stewart Hartshorn, whose goal was to create an "ideal town" for living close to nature and the countryside on the  he bought in the area in 1877. Many of the streets follow natural contours, and Hartshorn routed them to leave as many trees standing as possible.

It was added to the National Register of Historic Places in 1980. Millburn regulates development and redevelopment within it through a special section of its zoning.  The average house within the district was valued at over $2 million in 2015.

References

Geography of Essex County, New Jersey
Queen Anne architecture in New Jersey
Shingle Style architecture in New Jersey
National Register of Historic Places in Essex County, New Jersey
Historic districts on the National Register of Historic Places in New Jersey
Millburn, New Jersey